Bakrie Tower is a skyscraper in Jakarta, Indonesia. The 50-story building was completed in 2009, construction having begun in 2006.

See also

Skyscraper design and construction
List of tallest buildings in Indonesia
List of tallest buildings in Jakarta

References

Bakrie Group
Buildings and structures in Jakarta
Commercial buildings completed in 2009